The following lists events that happened during 1899 in Chile.

Incumbents
President of Chile: Federico Errázuriz Echaurren

Events 
4 February - Chile-Denmark relations: Chile signs a commerce treaty with Denmark.
24 March - The Puna de Atacama dispute is resolved.

Births
22 April - Eduardo Cruz-Coke (died 1974)
16 August - Salvador Reyes Figueroa (died 1970)
1 October - Ricardo Romero (fencer)
7 December - Felipe Iturriaga (died 1977)

Deaths 
18 February - Ambrosio Montt Luco (born 1830)

References 

 
Years of the 19th century in Chile
Chile